Hörsching is a municipality in the district Linz-Land in the Austrian state of Upper Austria. It is next to the Linz Airport which is served by a shuttle bus from the Hörsching railway station. Anton Bruckner was schooled for a time in the village.

Population

References

Cities and towns in Linz-Land District